Antonescu is a common family name in Romania derived from the root name, Antonius. Persons named Antonescu include:
 Ion Antonescu, Romanian politician and soldier, Conducător during World War II
 Crin Antonescu, Romanian politician, Minister of Youth and Sports, President of the Senate
 Dumitru Antonescu, Romanian footballer
 Maria Antonescu, Romanian socialite, wife of Ion Antonescu
 Mihai Antonescu, Romanian politician, Minister of Foreign Affairs of Romania during World War II
 Petre Antonescu, Romanian architect
 Petre Antonescu, Romanian soldier
 Teohari Antonescu, Romanian politician 
 Victor Antonescu, Romanian politician
 Victor Antonescu, Romanian film director

See also

Notes

Romanian-language surnames
Patronymic surnames
Surnames from given names